Penco (Mapudungun: See (Pen), Water (Ko)), is a Chilean city and commune in Concepción Province, Bío Bío Region on the Bay of Concepción.  Founded as the city of Concepción del Nuevo Extremo ('beginning of the new extreme') on February 12, 1550 by Pedro de Valdivia, it is the third oldest city in Chile, after capital Santiago founded first in 1541 and La Serena second in 1544.

As there may be confusion between the demonyms of the inhabitants of Concepción and Penco. Due to the previous location of Concepción, inhabitants of that city are called penquistas while inhabitants of Penco are known as pencones.

History 
In previous centuries, in the current location of Penco, was the first location where the city of Concepción was established, which is now the capital of the Bíobío Region. It was destroyed by Lautaro in 1554, and rebuilt and destroyed again by Lautaro in 1555.
 It was reestablished in 1557 during the governorship of marquess García Hurtado de Mendoza when he landed there and built a fort on the Alto de Pinto. The city was reestablished January 6, 1558, by capitán Jerónimo de Villegas. 
 It became the headquarters of the military forces engaged against the native Mapuche in Araucanía over the next two centuries, growing to a population of 10,000 despite suffering a siege in 1564 and other attacks by Mapuche tribals.
 In 1603 the last bishop of the suppressed Diocese of La Imperial was transferred there as first bishop of the successor see Roman Catholic Archdiocese of Concepción.
 Due to earthquakes and tsunamis, which razed the city in 1570, 1657, 1687, 1730 and another on May 25, 1751, the colonial authorities ultimately decided to move the city to its current location to the Valle de la Mocha, alongside the Bío Bío River and prohibited the occupation of the old location, which remained unpopulated until March 29, 1842, when the present city of Penco was founded.

Statistics 
Of these, 45,361 (98.6%) lived in urban areas and 655 (1.4%) in rural areas. The population grew by 14% (5,657 persons) between the 1992 and 2002 censuses.

Administration 
As a commune, Penco is a third-level administrative division of Chile administered by a municipal council, headed by an alcalde who is directly elected every four years. The 2012-2016 alcalde is Víctor Hugo Figueroa  (ILE).

Within the electoral divisions of Chile, Penco is represented in the Chamber of Deputies by Sergio Bobadilla (UDI) and Clemira Pacheco (PS) as part of the 45th electoral district, (together with Tomé, Florida, Hualqui, Coronel and Santa Juana). The commune is represented in the Senate by Alejandro Navarro Brain (MAS) and Hosain Sabag Castillo (PDC) as part of the 12th senatorial constituency (Biobío-Cordillera).

Places
In addition to the main town of Penco, the commune administers the following villages:
 Cerro Verde, 
 Cosmito, 
 El Rosal, 
 Lirquén, 
 Tucapel, .

Notable people 
Patricio Renán

References 

  Francisco Solano Asta-Buruaga y Cienfuegos, Diccionario geográfico de la República de Chile, SEGUNDA EDICIÓN CORREGIDA Y AUMENTADA, NUEVA YORK, D. APPLETON Y COMPAÑÍA. 1899.  Pg. 533-535, Penco.

Sources and external links 
   Municipality of Penco
   David Marley, Historic Cities of the Americas: An Illustrated Encyclopedia,  ABC-CLIO, 2005  
  Concepcion *

Communes of Chile
Populated places established in 1842
Geography of Biobío Region
Populated places in Concepción Province
1842 establishments in Chile
Coasts of Biobío Region
Port cities in Chile